Bastilla subacuta is a moth of the family Noctuidae first described by George Thomas Bethune-Baker in 1906. It is found in New Guinea and Seram.

Subspecies
Bastilla subacuta subacuta
Bastilla subacuta juncta (Seram)

References

External links
Holloway, J. D. & Miller, Scott E. (2003). "The composition, generic placement and host-plant relationships of the joviana-group in the Parallelia generic complex". Invertebrate Systematics. 17: 111–128.

Bastilla (moth)
Moths described in 1906